Louis Trolle Hjelmslev (3 October 189930 May 1965) was a Danish linguist whose ideas formed the basis of the Copenhagen School of linguistics. Born into an academic family (his father was the mathematician Johannes Hjelmslev), Hjelmslev studied comparative linguistics in Copenhagen, Prague and Paris (with Antoine Meillet and Joseph Vendryes, among others). In 1931, he founded the Cercle Linguistique de Copenhague. Together with Hans Jørgen Uldall he developed a structuralist theory of language which he called glossematics, which further developed the semiotic theory of Ferdinand de Saussure. Glossematics as a theory of language is characterized by a high degree of formalism. It is interested in describing the formal and semantic characteristics of language in separation from sociology, psychology or neurobiology, and has a high degree of logical rigour. Hjelmslev regarded linguistics – or glossematics – as a formal science. He was the inventor of formal linguistics. Hjelmslev's theory became widely influential in structural and functional grammar, and in semiotics.

Life
Hjelmslev was born in 1899 in Copenhagen. He enrolled into the University of Copenhagen in 1917 to study Romance and later comparative philology, where he studied with Holger Pedersen among others. His MA thesis on Lithuanian phonetics was finished in 1923 based on fieldwork in Lithuania in 1921. He received a doctorate in comparative Indo-European philology for his Études baltiques from 1932, and later took over Holger Pedersen's chair in Copenhagen after having been in Aarhus from 1934 to 1937.

He was married to Vibeke Mackeprang.

The Linguistic Circle of Copenhagen 

The Linguistic Circle of Copenhagen was founded by Hjelmslev and a group of Danish colleagues on 24 September 1931. Their main inspiration was the Prague Linguistic Circle, which had been founded in 1926. It was, in the first place, a forum for discussion of theoretical and methodological problems in linguistics. Initially, their interest lay mainly in developing an alternative concept of the phoneme, but it later developed into a complete theory which was coined glossematics, and was notably influenced by structuralism. Membership of the group grew rapidly and a significant list of publications resulted, including an irregular series of larger works under the name Travaux du Cercle Linguistique de Copenhague. A Bulletin was produced, followed by an international journal for structuralistic research in language, Acta Linguistica (later called Acta Linguistica Hafniensia), which was founded with the members of the Prague Linguistic Circle. It was, at that time, the sole journal explicitly dedicated to structuralism. With one short break from 1934 to 1937, while he lectured at the Aarhus University, Hjelmslev acted as chairman of the Circle until shortly before his death in 1965. The Linguist Circle of Copenhagen still exists today and arranges seminars, publishes Acta Linguistica Hafniensia and runs subcommittees.

Theoretical work 
Hjelmslev published his first paper at the age of 25. His first major book, Principes de grammaire générale, which he finished in 1928, is an invaluable source for anyone interested in Hjelmslev's work. During the 1930s Hjelmslev wrote another book, La catégorie des cas, which was a major contribution to linguistics. In this book, Hjelmslev analysed the general category of case in detail, providing ample empirical material supporting his hypotheses. It is important to read Hjelmslev's work as a continuous evolving theory on the epistemology of linguistics. He made his first academic journey at 1921 to Lithuania to study Lithuanian, an experience which can be traced throughout his works.

His most well-known book, Omkring sprogteoriens grundlæggelse, or in English translation, Prolegomena to a Theory of Language, first published in 1943, critiques the then-prevailing methodologies in linguistics as being descriptive, even anecdotal, and not systematising. He proposed a linguistic theory intended to form the basis of a more rational linguistics and a contribution to general epistemology. Like Ferdinand de Saussure (1857–1913), he accepted language as a system of signs, from the point of view of language use. He argued that a theory of semiotics should be consistent within itself, comprehensive, and as simple as possible.

Hjelmslev's sign model

Hjelmslev's sign model is a development of Saussure's bilateral sign model. Saussure considered a sign as having two sides, signifier and signified. Hjelmslev famously renamed signifier and signified as respectively expression plane and content plane, and also distinguished between form and substance. The combinations of the four would distinguish between form of content, form of expression, substance of content, and substance of expression. In Hjelmslev's analysis, a sign is a function between two forms, the content form and the expression form, and this is the starting point of linguistic analysis. However, every sign function is also manifested by two substances: the content substance and the expression substance. The content substance is the physical and conceptual manifestation of the sign. The expression substance is the physical substance wherein a sign is manifested. This substance can be sound, as is the case for most known languages, but it can be any material support whatsoever, for instance, hand movements, as is the case for sign languages, or distinctive marks on a suitable medium as in the many different writing systems of the world.

In short, Hjelmslev was proposing an open-ended, scientific method of analysis as a new semiotics. In proposing this, he was reacting against the conventional view in phonetics that sounds should be the focus of enquiry. Some have interpreted his work as if Hjelmslev argued that no sign can be interpreted unless it is contextualisedtreating his functives, expression and content as the general connotative mechanisms (for instance by Algirdas Julius Greimas)for Hjelmslev the point of view of the linguist on meaning is that of the form of content. Even if the content substance is important, one has to analyse it from the point of view of the form. Not only do pictures and literature manifest the same organising principles, but, more broadly, seeing and hearing, though certainly not identical, interact in surprisingly complex ways at deeper levels of the sign hierarchy which Hjelmslev sought to understand.

Assessment 
Hjelmslev made a bold proposal to transform technical analysis into a broad enquiry, emphasising that the true focus of linguistics should be the language and the human culture that continually reinvents it, and all society's memory of its accumulated knowledge preserved through language. This was a challenging but constructive argument at the time, and remains one that still has relevance today.  Most conspicuously, Hjelmslev's lines of inquiry have been taken up by Gilles Deleuze and Félix Guattari (see the "Postulates of Linguistics" and "Geology of Morals" chapters of A Thousand Plateaus), and subsequently their followers.

Terminology 
Hjelmslev introduced the terms glosseme, ceneme, prosodeme and plereme as linguistic units, analogous to phoneme, morpheme, etc.

Also, his most famous work, Prolegomena to a Theory of Language, is mostly concerned with the formal definition of a terminology for the analysis of any level of a system of signs, and as such there exists an exclusively Hjelmslevian terminology for that.

Selected publications
 Hjelmslev, Louis (1928). Principes de grammaire générale. Copenhague: Bianco Lundo.
 Hjelmslev, Louis (1935/37). Catégorie des cas (2 volumes). Acta Jutlandica VII, IX.
 Hjelmslev, Louis (1953[1943]). Prolegomena to a Theory of Language. Baltimore: Indiana University Publications in Anthropology and Linguistics (IJAL Memoir, 7) (2nd OD (slightly rev.): Madison: University of Wisconsin Press, 1961. Dt.: Hjelmslev 1974.
 Hjelmslev, Louis (1956). Sur l'indépendance de l'épithète. Copenhague: Historisk-filologiske Meddelelser udgivet af Det Kongelige Danske Videnskabernes Selskab, i kommission hos Ejnar Munksgaard.
 Hjelmslev, Louis (1975). Résumé of a Theory of Language. Travaux du Cercle linguistique de Copenhague, vol. XVI. Copenhague: Nordisk Sprog- og Kulturforlag.

Notes

References 
Deleuze and Guattari (1980). A Thousand Plateaus, chap. 3: 10,000 B.C.: The Geology of Morals (Who Does the Earth Think It Is?), pp. 48–50 of the English edition
Groupe µ (1976). A General Rhetoric, section 2.0: Figures of narration - generalities
Metcalf, Beth, Hjelmslev’s Univocity
Nöth, Winfried (1990). Handbook of semiotics, p. 66, section 3
Oller, J. W., Jr. & J. Giardetti, J. R. (1999). Images that work: Creating successful messages in marketing and high stakes communication. Westport, Connecticut: Quorum Books, p. 174

Further reading 
 Badir, Sémir (2000). Hjelmslev. Paris: Les Belles Lettres.
 Deleuze, Gilles and Félix Guattari (1987). A Thousand Plateaus: Capitalism and Schizophrenia. Trans. Brian Massumi.  Minneapolis:  University of Minnesota Press.
 Derrida, Jacques (1974). Of Grammatology. Johns Hopkins University Press.
 Eco, Umberto (2001). Experiences of Translation. University of Toronto Press.
 Eco, Umberto (1976). A Theory of Semiotics. University of Indiana Press.
 Rasmussen, Michael (1992). Hjelmslevs sprogteori. Glossematikken i videnskabshistorisk, videnskabsteoretisk og erkendelsesteoretisk perspektiv. Odense: Odense Universitetsforlag
 Siertsema, Bertha (1965). A study of glossematics. Critical Survey of its fundamental concepts (2nd rev. edition). Den Haag: Martinus Nijhoff.
 Taverniers, Miriam (2008). "Hjelmslev’s semiotic model of language: An exegesis". Semiotica'' 171: 367-394. (doi: 10.1515/SEMI.2008.082)

External links 
 www.signosemio.com - Signo - Hjelmslev's biography and Hjelmslev's semiotics theories (in English, also available in French)
 Circolo Glossematico
 It from bit and fit from bit.  On the origin and impact of information in the average evolution (Yves Decadt, 2000). Book published in Dutch with English paper summary in The Information Philosopher, http://www.informationphilosopher.com/solutions/scientists/decadt/
 Hjelmslev's Net

Balticists
1899 births
1965 deaths
Academic staff of the University of Copenhagen
Academic staff of Aarhus University
University of Copenhagen alumni
Linguists from Denmark
Danish semioticians
20th-century linguists